"Andamento lento" (transl. "Slow Andament") is a 1988 song composed by Tullio De Piscopo, Giosy Capuano and Mario Capuano and performed by Tullio De Piscopo. The song premiered at the 38th edition of the Sanremo Music Festival, where it ranked only 18th. It eventually turned to be De Piscopo's signature song and his main commercial success, as well as the best selling single of that edition of the Festival.

Track listing

   7" single 
 "Andamento lento"  (Tullio De Piscopo, Giosy Capuano, Mario Capuano)
 "Tamboo-tamboo da rè" (Tullio De Piscopo, Giosy Capuano, Mario Capuano)

Charts

References

 

1988 singles
Italian songs
1988 songs
Sanremo Music Festival songs